Pavel Konstantinovich Mamayev (born 17 September 1988) is a Russian former footballer who played as midfielder. He primarily played as a right midfielder or central midfielder. At CSKA Moscow he played as a defensive midfielder or deep-lying playmaker. On 8 May 2019, he was convicted in court of "intended infliction of minor harm to a health official" and sentenced to imprisonment until late 2019. He was released on 17 September 2019.

Club career
Mamayev began his career at the FC Torpedo Moscow academy. He moved to CSKA Moscow in summer 2007, and made his debut on 29 July 2007 against FC Khimki.

In July 2013 Mamayev joined FC Krasnodar on a season long loan from CSKA Moscow. On 6 December 2013, FC Krasnodar bought out his contract from CSKA and he signed a 3-year contract.

Mamayev had his contract with Krasnodar terminated on 20 September 2019.

On 28 September 2019, FC Rostov announced the signing of Mamayev, signing him to a two-year contract with the option of another.

On 20 December 2021, Pavel signed a contract with FC Khimki. Mamayev left Khimki on 3 June 2022.

On 11 February 2023, Mamayev announced his retirement as a player.

International career
Mamaev was a part of the Russia U-21 side that was competing in the 2011 European Under-21 Championship qualification.

In 2009, he was called up for the Russia senior national team for the first time. He made his debut for the national team on 17 November 2010 in a game against Belgium.

Personal life
On 7 October 2018, after Krasnodar's Russian Premier League game away to Zenit St.Petersburg, in which Mamayev scored Krasnodar's goal in a 2–1 defeat, Mamayev and Aleksandr Kokorin traveled to Moscow for a night out. The following morning both Mamayev and Kokorin are said to have been involved in a drunken attack on Russian Trade Ministry official Denis Pak, resulting in Pak requiring medical attention. As a result, Krasnodar announced that they had imposed the maximum fine they could on Mamayev, removed him from first team training and were investigating how to terminate his contract. Hours before that incident, Mamayev, Kokorin and other young people were involved in an altercation with the driver of a Channel One show presenter; he received brain damage, nose fracture and face contusions after numerous punches. Mamayev was apprehended for two months. Mamayev remained in prison until his trial, which began on 9 April 2019. On 8 May 2019, he was sentenced to 17 months in penal colony. Considering the time he spent in pre-trial detention, the latest possible date for his release from custody was 13 November 2019. He was released on 17 September 2019.

Career statistics

Club

Honours
CSKA Moscow
Russian Premier League: 2012–13
Russian Cup: 2009, 2011, 2012–13
Russian Super Cup: 2009, 2013

Individual
In the list of 33 best football players of the championship of Russia: 2010

References

External links
 CSKA profile 
 Torpedo Moscow profile 

1988 births
Footballers from Moscow
Living people
Russian footballers
Russia youth international footballers
Russia under-21 international footballers
Russia international footballers
Association football midfielders
PFC CSKA Moscow players
FC Torpedo Moscow players
FC Krasnodar players
FC Rostov players
FC Khimki players
Russian Premier League players
Russian First League players
UEFA Euro 2016 players
Sportspeople convicted of crimes